José Joaquim Pimentel Ribeiro (born 2 November 1957) is a Portuguese retired footballer who played as a left winger.

Club career
Ribeiro was born in Vila Nova da Barquinha, Santarém District. During his professional career he represented Vitória de Setúbal, U.F.C.I. Tomar, C.F. União de Coimbra, Vitória de Guimarães, Amora FC, Académica de Coimbra, Boavista FC, S.C. Farense and S.C. Olhanense, retiring in 1990 at the age of 32 but continuing to play at amateur level.

Nine of Ribeiro's 17 senior seasons were spent in the Primeira Liga, where he amassed totals of 146 games and 20 goals.

International career
Ribeiro earned two caps for the Portugal national team, all in 1985, and was selected to the following year's FIFA World Cup.

References

External links

1957 births
Living people
Portuguese footballers
Association football wingers
Primeira Liga players
Liga Portugal 2 players
Vitória F.C. players
U.F.C.I. Tomar players
Vitória S.C. players
Amora F.C. players
Associação Académica de Coimbra – O.A.F. players
Boavista F.C. players
S.C. Farense players
S.C. Olhanense players
Portugal under-21 international footballers
Portugal international footballers
1986 FIFA World Cup players
Sportspeople from Santarém District